is the fourth live album by Japanese idol duo Pink Lady. Recorded live at the Tropicana in Las Vegas, Nevada on April 21-22, 1978 during the duo's first American tour, the album was released on June 25, 1978.

The album peaked at No. 6 on Oricon's weekly albums chart and sold over 80,000 copies.

Track listing

Personnel
 Mie & Kei - vocals
 LA Orchestra & Chuck Rainey Rhythm Section
 Chuck Rainey - bass
 Mitch Holder - guitar
 Paul Leim - drums
 Mike Lang - keyboards
 Tadayuki Harada - conductor
 Norio Maeda - arrangement

Charts

References

External links

 
 

1978 live albums
Pink Lady (band) live albums
Japanese-language live albums
Victor Entertainment live albums
Albums recorded at the Tropicana Las Vegas